Pinilla is a surname. Notable people with the surname include:

Mauricio Pinilla (born 1984), Chilean footballer
Antonio Pinilla (born 1971), Spanish footballer
Juan Pinilla (born 1981), Spanish flamenco singer, critic, writer, and columnist
Gustavo Rojas Pinilla (1900–1975), Colombian army general, civil engineer, and politician